Randi Stacey Boothe-Wilson (known primarily by her middle name) was a formerly unidentified American woman discovered dead in Jacksonville, Onslow County, North Carolina on December 6, 1995.

Life and disappearance

Boothe-Wilson was a United States Marine who married fellow Marine Earle Wilson in 1981. The couple had two sons, Earle III in 1984 and Elliot in 1987, and one daughter, Leslye. Earle and Boothe-Wilson's marriage began to worsen in 1994, and they divorced after a discharge from the Marine Corps in August 1994. Earle also usually made late child support payments. Boothe-Wilson left and traveled across the country with her children to her native New York. The family moved into an apartment and moved to different locations, such as Boothe-Wilson's mother's home. Boothe-Wilson was working as a security guard for a Manhattan museum at the time.

On October 28, 1994, Boothe-Wilson left her children to go visit her sister in Queens, New York, but never arrived. Later, Boothe-Wilson's vehicle was found abandoned at a disputed location.

Letters to her children were discovered that indicated she planned to leave them. Her credit cards were later mailed to her husband. Forensic analysis of the letters addressed to her children was inconclusive with determining who had written them, although Boothe-Wilson's handwriting was similar.

Discovery

The body was found in a field in Jacksonville, North Carolina. The remains were believed to have been disposed around two years before. The victim's age range was estimated to have been between the early and late 30s, although The Doe Network reported that the age range was as large as 25 to 40. She was inaccurately believed to be Caucasian.

Near the skeleton was a strand of reddish hair that may have belonged to her. She had various evidence of dental work on her teeth, although some had protruded from her mouth. Examination of her body also indicated she had a divided rib. Items such as a Nike shoe, gold jewelry, hoop earrings, red, black and yellow clothing, a hotel key, and subway tokens from New York were also present at the scene.  No evidence of foul play was found on her bones, although it is believed that she was murdered.

Investigation
The case remains unsolved, although in 2012 police had a suspect in Matthew Lorne Alder, who had a possible connection with her death. He was imprisoned in 1995 for the rape and murder of Lisa Gipson. In 2013, he pleaded guilty to the murder of Wanda Musk. He currently is serving a life sentence for his crimes. The Jane Doe's case was featured on the website for America's Most Wanted but did not lead to her identification. Investigators, as of February 2019, would like to speak to anyone who knew Boothe-Wilson in the Marines or the circumstances of her presence in Jacksonville.

Her face was reconstructed, in 2D as well as 3D, as an attempt to show what she may have looked like when she was alive. Bone marrow was used as a source to develop a DNA Profile.

It was announced in February 2019 that the remains were identified as Boothe-Wilson after DNA was matched between the unidentified remains and her DNA profile in January. The match was made after DNA from an envelope sent by Boothe-Wilson was extracted from a stamp. Dental records were also compared.

See also
List of solved missing persons cases
List of unsolved deaths

References

1990s missing person cases
1994 murders in the United States
1995 murders in the United States
1994 in New York (state)
1995 in North Carolina
Deaths by person in the United States
Incidents of violence against women
Missing person cases in New York City
Unsolved murders in the United States
Violence against women in the United States
United States Marines
Female murder victims
Jacksonville, North Carolina
Women in North Carolina
Women in New York City
Killings in North Carolina